Whitehead Township is one of seven townships in Alleghany County, North Carolina, United States. The township had a population of 1,060 according to the 2010 census.

Whitehead Township occupies  in central Alleghany County. The township's southern border is with Wilkes County.

References

Townships in Alleghany County, North Carolina
Townships in North Carolina